Family trees
Qajar dynasty
Dynasty genealogy